Jake Hecht (born ) is an American mixed martial artist who competes in the Welterweight division. A professional MMA competitor since 2006, Hecht fought mostly in regional promotions across the midwestern and southeastern United States before signing with the UFC in 2011.

Career

Background
After finishing at the University of Missouri in 2006, Hecht began his mixed martial arts career in regional promotions, before going on the international scene in 2010. Hecht compiled an impressive 10-2 professional record including  notable wins over The Ultimate Fighter 13 alum Charlie Rader and future UFC Light Heavyweight Championship challenger Anthony Smith.

Ultimate Fighting Championship
Hecht made his promotional debut against Rich Attonito on December 10, 2011 at UFC 140. Hecht won the fight in the second round by way of TKO due to elbows and strikes from top position.

Hecht next faced TJ Waldburger on March 3, 2012 at UFC on FX 2. He lost the fight via submission in the first round.

Hecht was defeated by Sean Pierson on June 8, 2012 at UFC on FX 3 via unanimous decision.

Following his loss to Pierson, Hecht was released from the promotion.

Mixed martial arts record

|- 
| Loss
| align=center| 11–4
| Sean Pierson
| Decision (unanimous)
| UFC on FX: Johnson vs. McCall
| 
| align=center| 3
| align=center| 5:00
| Sunrise, Florida, United States
| 
|-
| Loss
| align=center| 11–3
| TJ Waldburger
| Submission (armbar)
| UFC on FX: Alves vs. Kampmann
| 
| align=center| 1
| align=center| 0:55
| Sydney, Australia
| 
|-
| Win
| align=center| 11–2
| Rich Attonito
| TKO (elbows and punches)
| UFC 140
| 
| align=center| 2
| align=center| 1:10
| Toronto, Ontario, Canada
|Welterweight debut.
|-
| Win
| align=center| 10–2
| Michele Verginelli
| Decision (unanimous)
| Cage Warriors: Fight Night 1
| 
| align=center| 3
| align=center| 5:00
| Amman, Jordan
| 
|-
| Win
| align=center| 9–2
| Craig White
| Submission (north-south choke)
| Cage Warriors: 42
| 
| align=center| 2
| align=center| 4:58
| Cork, Ireland
| 
|-
| Win
| align=center| 8–2
| Eddie Larrea
| TKO (punches)
| PCL: Cage Madness
| 
| align=center| 3
| align=center| 1:22
| Glen Carbon, Illinois, United States
| 
|-
| Loss
| align=center| 7–2
| Che Mills
| Decision (unanimous)
| Cage Warriors 38: Young Guns
| 
| align=center| 3
| align=center| 5:00
| London, England
| 
|-
| Win
| align=center| 7–1
| Charlie Rader
| Decision (unanimous)
| Empire FC: A Night of Reckoning 2
| 
| align=center| 3
| align=center| 5:00
| Tunica, Mississippi, United States
| 
|-
| Win
| align=center| 6–1
| Anthony Smith
| TKO (punches)
| VFC 30: Night of Champions
| 
| align=center| 3
| align=center| 4:35
| Council Bluffs, Iowa, United States
| 
|-
| Win
| align=center| 5–1
| Andy Uhrich
| Submission (triangle choke)
| CA: Battlegrounds
| 
| align=center| 2
| align=center| 2:02
| Millington, Tennessee, United States
| 
|-
| Win
| align=center| 4–1
| David Brown
| Decision (unanimous)
| Cage Assault: On Edge
| 
| align=center| 3
| align=center| 5:00
| Memphis, Tennessee, United States
| 
|-
| Win
| align=center| 3–1
| Sean Westbrook
| Submission (north-south choke)
| VFC 27: Mayhem
| 
| align=center| 2
| align=center| 3:48
| Council Bluffs, Iowa, United States
| 
|-
| Win
| align=center| 2–1
| Matt Miller
| Submission (triangle choke)
| EFL: Elite Fight League
| 
| align=center| 1
| align=center| 4:24
| Council Bluffs, Iowa, United States
| 
|-
| Win
| align=center| 1–1
| Cody Frye
| Submission (rear naked choke) 
| MFL: Midwest Fight League
| 
| align=center| 1
| align=center| 4:27
| Boonville, Missouri, United States
| 
|-
| Loss
| align=center| 0–1
| Manuel Garcia
| Decision (unanimous) 
| AFC: Absolute Fighting Championships 16
| 
| align=center| 2
| align=center| 5:00
| Boca Raton, Florida, United States
|

References

External links
Official UFC Profile

Welterweight mixed martial artists
American male mixed martial artists
Mixed martial artists from Missouri
People from St. Louis
People from Lincoln County, Missouri
Living people
People from Springfield, Illinois
Year of birth missing (living people)
Ultimate Fighting Championship male fighters